The San Diego Trolley  is a light rail system operating in the metropolitan area of San Diego. It is known colloquially as "The Trolley". The Trolley's operator, San Diego Trolley, Inc. (SDTI), is a subsidiary of the San Diego Metropolitan Transit System (MTS). The Trolley began service on July 26, 1981, making it the oldest of the second-generation light rail systems in the United States. The Trolley system serves 62 stations, comprises  of route, three primary lines (Blue Line, Orange Line, and Green Line) that operate daily, and one heritage line (Silver Line) that operates on a circuit of downtown on select days.

History

Early history 
Electric rail service in San Diego traces its roots back to 1891 when John D. Spreckels incorporated the San Diego Electric Railway. San Diego's streetcar system had been replaced with buses in 1949, and by 1966 the local bus company, San Diego Transit, was facing a financial crisis and public takeover.

Planning for mass transit in the San Diego region began in 1966 under the auspices of the Comprehensive Planning Organization (CPO, now known as the San Diego Association of Governments, SANDAG), an intergovernmental agency of 13 cities and San Diego County.

Over the next decade, the CPO researched various technologies were studied including improvements to local buses, express buses, heavy rail, light rail, and advanced technologies. The CPO also closely studied the San Francisco Bay Area Rapid Transit (BART) system, then under construction. Ultimately, the early studies went nowhere due to disagreements between stakeholders and a lack of funding.

In 1975, the CPO published the Regional Transportation Plan which included  intermediate capacity fixed guideway system (an untested technology at the time) at a cost of $1.5 billion.

Metropolitan Transit Development Board 
In the early 1970s, three state legislative acts would set the stage for the construction of mass transit in the San Diego region.

Transportation Development Act, signed by Gov. Ronald Reagan in 1971, earmarked 0.25 percent of the state sales tax for funding transportation projects, including mass transit. A 1974 amendment to Article 19 of the Constitution of California permitted the use of gas tax revenues, previously reserved for highway construction, for construction of rail systems. Finally, a 1975 law established the San Diego Metropolitan Transit Development Board (MTDB) with a clear mission: design, construct and operate a guideway transit system. The entire process was assigned to MTDB to assure accountability. The legislation was written and supported by State Senator James R. Mills, the President Pro Tem during this period and a strong transit advocate.

The MTDB formally started operations on January 1, 1976. The MTDB's enabling legislation and principles adopted by the Board required the planning give added weight to systems that satisfy a number of criteria: priority consideration for technologies available and in use, a system that is capable of being brought into operation incrementally, and using rights-of-way owned by public entities to minimize construction costs.

In December 1976, the MTDB launched its 18-month Guideway Planning Project to be held in two phases. Phase 1 involved the evaluation of potential corridors based on the CPO's 1975 Regional Transportation Plan and was guided by principles set by the MTDB board: the corridor should extend a long-distance and offer high-speed operation, the system should be at grade in a mostly exclusive right-of-way, capital costs should be low, and operating deficits should be minimized. Phase 1 studied over 100 miles of potential corridors with 45 miles of corridor recommended for further evaluation in Phase 2. At about the same time, a working paper presented an evaluation of four guideway technologies: light rail, two categories of heavy rail, and Automated Small Vehicle Transit.

In August 1977, the MTDB board selected the South Bay region for the detailed Phase 2 study. There would be several potential corridors to consider, including along freeways (Interstate highways I-5, I-8 & I-805 and State Routes 94 & 16), along existing railroad rights-of-way, and arterial roads.

In October 1977 the board selected light rail as the lone guideway transit technology to be studied (it would also be compared to several all-bus alternatives). In making the decision to pursue light rail, the MTBD board said it best followed the principles it laid out as light rail can offer high-speed travel, the right-of-way is flexible, and construction costs can be low when at-grade construction is maximized. The technology was new for the United States, but was well established in Germany.

Hurricane Kathleen 
On September 10, 1976, nature intervened, setting off a chain of events that would help decide the corridor to be used.

Hurricane Kathleen destroyed parts of San Diego and Arizona Eastern Railway (SD&AE) Desert Line, at the time owned by Southern Pacific (SP) railroad. The SD&AE offered freight service between San Diego and points east with a line that traveled between Downtown San Diego, San Ysidro, Northern Mexico, and Imperial County before connecting with the rest of the SP system in Plaster City, California. The hurricane caused $1.3 million worth of damage to the line ($ adjusted for inflation), primarily in Imperial County, east of San Diego. Freight service was suspended, and in light of the extensive damages, SP petitioned the Interstate Commerce Commission to abandon the SD&AE on August 9, 1977.

The MTDB immediately began studying the SD&AE corridor between Downtown San Diego and the San Ysidro Port of Entry for joint use by electric light rail and freight trains. In June 1978, the MTDB found the entire joint-use project feasible.

At the same time, the San Diego County Board of Supervisors became concerned about the potential loss of freight service on the SD&AE, which was seen as vital to the county's economic interests and the continued viability of San Diego as a deep-water port. The county commissioned its own study to examine using a portion of the SD&AE tracks for passenger service which would share the track with freight services, the motivation being the transit services could share the costs of maintaining the tracks. San Diego County proposed operating either commuter rail trains or self-powered diesel rail cars.

Implementation 
 In 1978, the Interstate Commerce Commission denied the request to abandon the SD&AE, prompting Southern Pacific to offer the railroad for sale to anyone willing to maintain freight operations on the line. The MTDB stepped in and offered to buy the SD&AE for $18.1 million if the Southern Pacific fully repaired the hurricane-damaged line. The deal closed on August 20, 1979, with the final acquisition occurring on November 1, 1979. The MTDB quickly secured a deal with the San Diego and Imperial Valley Railroad to continue freight service along the line.

The purchase gave MTDB ownership of two sections of right-of-way that could be used for mass transit: the SD&AE Main Line from Downtown San Diego to San Ysidro, and the SD&AE La Mesa Branch from Downtown San Diego to El Cajon.

With all the planning in place, construction of the  "South Line" transit corridor (the southern portion of today's Blue Line) was able to begin just one month after acquisition in December 1979 and would be accomplished in two phases.

The first phase of the project cost $86 million, which included the purchase of the SD&AE, 14 light rail vehicles, construction of a single-tracked electrified light rail line along the  SD&AE Main Line and construction of a  section of new street running tracks in Downtown San Diego. To control costs, only minor rehabilitation was conducted on the SD&AE corridor, with the MTDB replacing about 40% of the ties, welding the jointed rail, constructing electric catenaries, and installing an absolute block signal system.

Funding for the project came entirely from Transportation Development Act state sales tax and local gas tax revenues. Federal funds were not actively sought due to the locally perceived notion that San Diego would not qualify due to low population densities, uncongested highways, and undefined corridors.

In August 1980, the MTDB established San Diego Trolley, Inc. to operate and maintain the new light rail system and on July 26, 1981, service began. Trains operated every 20 minutes (timed to meet at four passing tracks on the single track sections) between 5 am and 9 pm and carried approximately 10,000 passengers a day.

In light of the strong ridership, construction of the second phase was started almost immediately, which involved double-tracking the SD&AE corridor and purchasing 10 additional vehicles. Upon completion of double-tracking in February 1983, the total cost of the project was $116.6 million.

Expansion 
The San Diego Trolley added a second line on March 23, 1986, that shared the same Downtown tracks and traveled east to Euclid Avenue on the La Mesa Branch of the SD&AE. The new route was called then called the Euclid Line (today's Orange Line). This line was extended to El Cajon by June 23, 1989, at which time it was renamed the East Line. Service was expanded beyond the old SD&AE right-of-way when the line was extended further east to Santee on August 26, 1995.

The East Line's Bayside Connection extension to the Convention Center and Gaslamp Quarter opened on June 30, 1990. Later in the decade, the South Line was extended to the north, reaching Little Italy on July 2, 1992, and Old Town on June 16, 1996.

The system was further expanded with Mission Valley Line that opened on November 23, 1997, and extended tracks north from Old Town to Fashion Valley Mall, San Diego Stadium, and Mission San Diego de Alcalá. At that the same time, the South Line (which now traveled north of San Diego) and East Line of the system were renamed the Blue Line and the Orange Line, respectively.

One of the system's most ambitious expansions, the Mission Valley East extension, opened on July 10, 2005. The Mission Valley East extension built the only underground station in the system at San Diego State University and inaugurated the third route in the San Diego Trolley system, the Green Line. The line also featured the first low-floor trolley vehicles, that allow passengers to board without climbing stairs and allowed passengers using wheelchairs to use a small bridge plate instead of the slower lifts on the older trains. But, the new vehicles could only operate on the Green Line, forcing passengers heading between Mission Valley and Downtown San Diego to change trains in Old Town.

Trolley Renewal Project 

In the late 2000s, as parts of the San Diego Trolley approached 30 years old, the system was in need of an overhaul of its oldest facilities. Also, after the success of the low-floor trolley cars on the Green Line, the MTS wanted to operate similar vehicles on all lines.

Officials secured $660 million in funding after the 2008 election as voters passed the TransNet half-cent local sales tax and two statewide transportation bond measures. The project also received funding from the American Recovery and Reinvestment Act and federal formula funds.

The "Trolley Renewal Project" would entail several improvements. Each station would get larger shelters to provide more protection from sun and rain, new benches, and digital “next arrival” signs. Worn-out infrastructure was replaced as needed, including rails, ties, catenary wires, power lines and electrical substations. The project also included a new signalling system that will allow two freight trains to operate at night, rather than one.

Stations also needed a new "safety edge tile" with a smooth surface in the center to allow wheelchair ramps to deploy (the existing safety tile would stop ramps from fully deploying). The MTS teamed up with the Utah Transit Authority, which faced a similar problem with its system. The solution for both agencies was a specialized design Siemens called the S70 US ("Ultra Short") which retains the low-floor design, but would be the same length as the older high-floor vehicles.

The MTS and SANDAG agreed to purchase a total of 65 vehicles, which would arrive between September 2011 and January 27, 2015. However, there was not enough funding to replace all 123 high-floor cars at once. The decision was made to retire the original Siemens-Duewag U2 LRVs, and operate three-car trains with the new low-floor LRVs in the front and back, and an older high-floor Siemens SD-100 car in the middle.

In late 2010, work to rebuild the stations started at the Old Town Transit Center and worked south. By September 2, 2012, work was completed on the Old Town and Bayshore lines, allowing for a realignment of service. The Green Line was extended from its former western terminus in Old Town south to 12th & Imperial Transit Center's Bayside Terminal platform, while the Orange Line was truncated to Santa Fe Depot and the Blue Line to America Plaza. The new alignment means all lines now pass through downtown and created a universal transfer point for all lines at 12th & Imperial Transit Center.

By January 9, 2013, all stations on the Orange Line had been rebuilt, allowing low-floor LRVs to begin service on a second line.
Rebuilding of the remaining stations (all on the Blue Line) was completed by January 27, 2015, The project, including remaining station and track renovations, was completed in late 2015.

Mid-Coast Trolley extension project 
In 2011, SANDAG received key approval for the Mid-coast extension of the Blue Line, running from the Old Town Transit Center  to the University City community, serving major activity and employment centers such as the University of California, San Diego (UCSD) campus, three major hospitals on (and adjacent to) the campus, and University Towne Centre (UTC) shopping center. Construction began in October 2016, and train testing on the line began in late June 2021. The Mid-Coast extension opened on November 21, 2021.

The Blue Line was re-extended north from its original northern terminus at America Plaza to run through five existing stations (up to and including its pre-2012 terminus, the Old Town Transit Center), and continuing to nine new trolley stations: Tecolote Road, Clairemont Drive, Balboa Avenue, Nobel Drive, VA Medical Center, UCSD West/Pepper Canyon, UCSD East/Voigt Drive, Executive Drive, and UTC.  The northern terminal station, UTC, is part of the UTC Transit Center, at Westfield UTC in the University City/UCSD area.

Current service

Lines 
, trolley service operates on three daily lines: the Blue, Green, and Orange Lines, and traveling through 65 total miles of mostly double-track rail and serving 62 stations. A fourth line, the heritage streetcar Silver Line, operates more limited weekday and weekend service, in a clockwise 'circle-loop' around downtown San Diego only.

Stations 

The San Diego Trolley system has 62 operational stations serving its four Trolley lines.

Fourteen of the Trolley system's stations operate as transfer stations, which allow passengers to transfer between lines.  There is one universal transfer point (i.e. allowing for transfers among all four lines) in the system in downtown San Diego: the 12th & Imperial Transit Center station. The adjacent Santa Fe Depot/America Plaza/Courthouse stations, which are within walking distance of each other, also allow for transfer among the four lines.  Six Trolley stations are end-of-line stations. Of the 53 San Diego Trolley stations, 37 stations are within the city limits of San Diego, serving various neighborhoods in San Diego; the other 16 stations are located in the cities of Chula Vista, El Cajon, La Mesa, Lemon Grove, National City, and Santee.

Most of the stations in the San Diego Trolley system are 'at-grade' stations.  There are 8 aerial stations, mostly on the newer Green Line. There is just one Trolley station in the system that is underground – the SDSU Transit Center station – also on the Green Line.

About half of San Diego Trolley stations offer free park and ride lots. Most Trolley stations offer connections to MTS bus lines.

Hours of operation 
The San Diego Trolley's three main lines operate regular service between 5 am and midnight, seven days a week. Limited service on particular segments is provided before 5 am and after midnight. However, there is no rail service between 2 am and 3:30 am. During these hours when there is no passenger service, freight trains of the San Diego and Imperial Valley Railroad operate on the trolley's right of way.

Service on the Blue Line operates every 15 minutes, seven days a week, with service every 7.5 minutes during weekday rush-hours; late-night service on this line runs every 30 minutes. The Green and Orange Lines operate service every 15 minutes on Monday–Saturday mid-days, but every 30 minutes on weekend mornings, on Sundays, and during evenings.

Fares and fare collection 

The San Diego Trolley operates on a proof-of-payment system. Passengers must have proof of fare (ticket or pass) before boarding. Self-serve ticket-vending machines located at each station sell one-way paper tickets and passes (one day and monthly) on the Pronto Card.

Roving transit enforcement personnel conduct random ticket inspections throughout the system. If customers are caught without a valid fare, they may be fined. Based on frequent security inspections, nearly 98% of the 37 million patrons have proper fares.

One-way fares are good for up to two hours from the time of purchase. The fare does include a transfer to other routes, as long as it is within two hours from the time of purchase.

One-day and monthly passes are sold on the Pronto Card, which costs $2. Passes allow passengers to transfer a number of different transit systems within San Diego County including the San Diego Trolley, MTS Bus, MTS Rapid buses, NCTD Breeze buses, and the NCTD Sprinter (a light rail line in North San Diego County). More expensive premium passes include access to the NCTD Coaster commuter rail line, MTS Rapid Express, and MTS Rural buses.

Pronto cards are linked to an account which can store value to be used at any time. The Pronto card uses the "best fare," which is similar to pay-as-you-go. The card will automatically deduct a one-way fare each time it is tapped, and will cap the total fare deducted in a day to the limit of a Day Pass, which is $6. Pronto will also cap the total monthly fare to the same price as a Month Pass, which is $72.

The Pronto card must be tapped on a Pronto Card validator (located just outside the paid area of stations), or the QR code must be scanned from within the Pronto App when entering and transferring within the system in order to be validated.

Ridership 

As of the Fourth Quarter (Q4) of 2013, the average weekday ridership on the San Diego Trolley system was 119,800, making it the fourth busiest Light rail system in the United States. Taking overall track length into consideration, the San Diego Trolley transported 2,239 daily passengers per route mile in Q4 2014, making it the twelfth busiest Light rail system on a per mile basis over this time period. Weekday ridership on the Trolley has been relatively high since Q3 2013 (see table at right).

In all of 2014, the San Diego Trolley provided 39,731,900 unlinked passenger transits according to the American Public Transportation Association (APTA). MTS reported that there were 39,694,197 trips on the Trolley in Fiscal Year 2014 (FY 2014), a 34% increase over Fiscal Year 2013. Of the Trolley's three lines, the Blue Line has the system's highest ridership with 15,094,878 riders during FY 2014, followed by the Green Line with 13,673,926 FY 2014 riders, and the Orange Line with 10,896,289 FY 2014 riders. The Silver Line, operating only mid-days just four days a week (and with some service interruptions during the year), carried 29,104 passengers around the downtown loop in FY2014.

According to figures from APTA, previous to 2014, the San Diego Trolley achieved the highest level of ridership in 2007, when there were 36,386,100 unlinked passenger transits on the system over that entire year.  The Trolley system's highest average weekday ridership of 124,300 was achieved in Q3 2007 – this corresponded to 2,323 passengers per route mile daily.

Future

Proposed Balboa Park streetcar line 

MTS began work in March 2011 on a study to evaluate the feasibility of reconnecting Balboa Park, the San Diego Zoo and Downtown San Diego through a fixed-guideway, electrified streetcar line – the final study on the subject was published in October 2012. The project study corridor runs between the City College Trolley Station area, and Balboa Park in the vicinity of the San Diego Zoo. An alignment similar to the proposed one was last served by a streetcar system in 1949 on lines 7 (Park Boulevard-University Avenue to East San Diego) & 11 (Park Boulevard-Adams Avenue to Kensington). The Committee evaluated what types of streetcars to use for this proposed line, the possible options including the recently ordered 57 Ultra Short 2011 S70s in the "Modern Streetcar" category, and the restored PCC Streetcars from the Downtown Silver Line in the "Vintage Streetcar" category. The major construction issue was how to cross I-5 without having to reconstruct the entire bridge. The estimated cost for construction of this line was $68.2 million, with each trolley car estimated to cost between $850,000 (for a restored PCC trolley car) to $3.6 million (for a modern trolley car). Four cars are anticipated for service on this line. No funding sources were identified. No further action on this proposal has taken place since the October 2012 release of the study.

Proposed airport extension 
One of the biggest gaps in the San Diego Trolley system is the lack of a connection to the San Diego International Airport. The MTS says the extension presents engineering challenges and would be costly, but the agency's polls and outreach show the extension is one of the most desired projects among the public. Over the years there have been several proposals, with the most serious coming as part of the proposed "Elevate SD 2020" transit tax. That project would have created a new line that connected the airport to both the 12th & Imperial Transit Center and the Old Town Transit Center with a wye spur between the Middletown and Little Italy stations.  In April 2020, MTS decided not to pursue the transit tax ballot initiative. However, an extension of the trolley to the airport is included as an alternative proposal as part of SANDAG's Central Mobility Hub project for the airport, which is in the Draft Environmental Impact Report phase .

Connecting service between The Trolley and the airport is provided by local bus Route 992 that serves the Santa Fe Depot/America Plaza transit area. A secondary service is the airport's rental car shuttle, which has a stop on its route between the terminal and the rental car center that is a block from the Middletown trolley station.

Proposed Purple Line 

The Purple Line is a proposed San Diego Trolley line that would run from San Ysidro Transit Center at the United States–Mexico border to Kearny Mesa with a possible extension to Carmel Valley. It would run along, or close to I-805 and I-15.

In April 2011, the San Diego Association of Governments (SANDAG) released a draft of its 2050 Regional Transportation Plan, which was approved by the SANDAG Board of Directors on October 28, 2011. An inland Trolley line from San Ysidro to Kearny Mesa, though not yet called the Purple Line, was included in the plan.

In 2016, SANDAG had a measure on the ballot to fund development of the Purple Line. It failed to pass.

In April 2019, the MTS again included the Purple Line in a final version of a November ballot initiative to increase the countywide sales tax by a half-cent to fund future transit plans. In April 2020, MTS decided not to pursue the transit tax ballot initiative.

Fleet 

The San Diego Trolley operates on all its main lines with an all-Siemens fleet of light-rail vehicles (LRVs). It also runs 2 "heritage" PCC street cars on the Silver Line, a downtown-only circuit on a select schedule.

When the system opened in 1981, the agency purchased a fleet of 71 high-floor Siemens–Duewag U2 vehicles, originally designed for and used by the Frankfurt U-Bahn. At the time, no purpose-built LRVs were being manufactured for the North American market, so the model was adapted for use by San Diego and other transit systems in Canada. The vehicles were built in West Germany, with some assistance from a Siemens facility in Florin, California, a suburb of Sacramento. These cars were withdrawn from service between 2010 and 2015. Eleven of the U2 cars were sold to the new Metrotranvía Mendoza in Mendoza, Argentina in 2010, 29 were retired after the Orange Line was converted in early 2013, and the rest were retired after the Blue Line was converted in January 2015. Six U2 cars have been preserved: car 1001 was retained by MTS for use on the Silver Line, cars 1003 and 1008 were donated to the Southern California Railway Museum, cars 1017 and 1018 were donated to the Western Railway Museum, and car 1019 was donated to the Rockhill Trolley Museum. Car 1035 was sold in late 2020 to the Memphis Area Transit Authority, which operates a vintage-trolley system and intends to use the LRV for testing of modern, higher-capacity vehicles on its Madison Avenue Line.

In 1995, the San Diego Trolley purchased a fleet of 52 high-floor Siemens SD-100 vehicles, an evolution of the U2, but redesigned for the North American market. Starting with this order, all of San Diego's future LRVs would be built in California at the Florin factory.

Starting in 2005, San Diego started shifting to a low-floor fleet. The design of the Siemens S70 vehicles required that stations be designed with slightly higher platforms, so the 11 car fleet could only operate on the newly constructed Green Line. The other limitation of the S70 fleet was that they were about  longer than the SD-100 vehicles, which would make three-car trains longer than a single block in Downtown San Diego.

In 2009, San Diego ordered a fleet of 65 specialized Siemens S70 US ("Ultra Short") vehicles, which retain the low-floor design but would be the same length as the SD-100 vehicles.

In 2016, San Diego ordered an additional 45 specialized LRVs, this time the Siemens S700 US, which has a redesigned center section, with longitudinal seating (passengers facing the aisle) instead of the S70's more traditional seating with passengers sitting four-across, facing forward or back, with an aisle in between. This change, was made to eliminate a seating layout that had been criticized as cramped and ease the movement of passengers within that section. The San Diego Trolley ordered an additional 25 S700 US vehicles in 2019, scheduled for delivery by the end of 2021.

Current rail fleet

Specifications 
Below are the technical specifications of the system's five different fleet series of light rail vehicles:.

In addition to the aforementioned vehicles, two heritage Presidents Conference Committee (PCC) streetcars from 1946 operate on the Silver Line.
 Car 529 has been operating on the Silver Line since its opening in 2011.
 Car 530 has been operating on the Silver Line since March 2015.

An order was placed in mid-2019 for 25 more S700 light rail vehicles, in addition to the 45 S700s ordered in 2016 and delivered in 2018–2020.

Floor plans 
Below are the floor plans of the system's five different models of light rail vehicle, comparing the various sizes and interior layouts:

See also 

 San Diego and Arizona Eastern Railway
 San Diego Electric Railway
 San Diego Metropolitan Transit System
 List of bus routes in San Diego
 San Diego Transit
 Santa Fe Depot (aka. Union Station)
 Coaster (commuter rail)
 Pacific Surfliner
 List of United States light rail systems by ridership
 List of rail transit systems in the United States
 Light rail in the United States
 List of North American light rail systems by ridership
 Light rail in North America
 North County Transit District
 Sprinter (light rail)
 Transportation in San Diego County
 Transportation in San Diego

Notes

References

Sources 

 Gena Holle, The San Diego Trolley, Interurban Press (1995); "Guideway Planning Project Final Report"
 MTDB (1978); "Report on Feasibility of Using Existing SD&AE ROW for Commuter Service"
 San Diego County (1978); MTDB publicity materials including "San Diego Trolley, Inc. Summary" (1997), MTDB Progress Report 1976–1986; Pacific Southwest Railway Museum, San Diego & Arizona Railway.

External links 

Official Metropolitan Transit System website
San Diego Electric Railway Association
San Diego Trolley Photos
Map of the San Diego Trolley System

 
Trolley
Passenger rail transportation in California
Light rail in California
Electric railways in California
Public transportation in San Diego County, California
Transportation in San Diego
Railway lines opened in 1981
Tram, urban railway and trolley companies
600 V DC railway electrification
1981 establishments in California